Droplet ("little drop") and droplets (plural form) may refer to:
Water droplet, a small column of water (liquid)
Oil droplet, a small column of oil (liquid)

Technology
Acoustic droplet vaporization, the phase-transitioned of liquid droplets into gas bubbles by means of ultrasound
Acoustic droplet ejection, move of fluid drops without any physical contact by means of ultrasound
Droplet-shaped wave, casual localized solutions of the wave equation
Electrodynamic droplet deformation, liquid droplets suspended in a liquid exposed to an oscillating electric field
Electron-hole droplets, condensed phase of excitons in semiconductors
Liquid droplet radiator, a proposed lightweight radiator
Droplets (programming environment),  a computer programming environment
Droplets, the name for virtual private servers from DigitalOcean
A kind of applet in Apple's scripting language AppleScript

Biology and medicine
Lipid droplet, lipid-rich cellular organelles
Respiratory droplet, pathogen-containing particles of respiratory secretions

Other
Hand-with-droplets (hieroglyph), the ancient Egyptian Hand-with-droplets hieroglyph

See also
 Drop (disambiguation)